A Kind of Murder is a 2016 American mystery thriller film, directed by Andy Goddard from a screenplay by Susan Boyd. It is based upon the 1954 Patricia Highsmith novel The Blunderer. It stars Patrick Wilson, Jessica Biel, Vincent Kartheiser, Haley Bennett, and Eddie Marsan. The film had its world premiere at the Tribeca Film Festival on April 17, 2016.

The film was released in the United States on December 16, 2016, by Magnolia Pictures.

Plot
Walter Stackhouse is an architect by day, and an aspiring writer by night. He writes short-story crime fiction and is fascinated by a recent murder of a local woman. He meets her husband by visiting the man's used bookstore. Stackhouse has a troubled marriage, and his wife turns up dead. The police detective investigating both deaths suspects each husband of killing his wife, and a possible connection between the two crimes.

Cast
 Patrick Wilson as Walter Stackhouse
 Jessica Biel as Clara Stackhouse
 Vincent Kartheiser as Detective Lawrence Corby
 Haley Bennett as Ellie Briess
 Eddie Marsan as Marty Kimell
 Jon Osbeck as Jon Carr 
 Radek Lord as Tony Ricco
 Christine Dye as Claudia
 Michael Douglas Hall as Mr. Devries

Production
In February 2013, it was revealed that Andy Goddard had been attached to direct the film, from a screenplay by Susan Boyd, with Ted Hope, Christine Vachon, and Kelly McCormick producing under their Killer Films and Sierra Pictures banner, respectively. In May 2014, it was announced that Patrick Wilson, Jessica Biel, Imogen Poots and Toby Jones had been cast in the film. In November 2014, Haley Bennett joined the cast of the film, replacing Poots. That same month, Eddie Marsan joined the cast of the film, replacing Jones. In August 2015, the film was re-titled "A Kind of Murder".

Filming
Principal photography began on November 17, 2014 in Cincinnati, Ohio, under the title "The Blunderer". In December 2014, a casting call was put out for 1950 cars, and male extras. Production concluded on December 16, 2014.

Post-production
In June 2015, it was reported that Danny Bensi and Saunder Jurriaans had composed the score for the film.

Release
The film had its world premiere at the Tribeca Film Festival on April 17, 2016. Shortly after, Magnolia Pictures acquired distribution rights to the film. The film was released on December 16, 2016.

Reception
On Rotten Tomatoes the film has an approval rating of 35% based on reviews from 17 critics. On Metacritic the film has a score of 50% based on reviews from 7 critics, indicating "mixed or average reviews".

Nick Schager of Variety wrote: "While thrills are mitigated by convoluted plotting and suspect character behavior, the film's uniquely bleak twist on classic noir conventions is enlivening."

John DeFore of The Hollywood Reporter called it "A handsome period piece that plays more like a scant-clues mystery than like the psychological thriller it intends to be."

See also
 Enough Rope (1963)

References

External links
 

2016 films
2010s mystery thriller films
American thriller drama films
American independent films
American mystery thriller films
Films based on American novels
Films based on works by Patricia Highsmith
Films set in New York City
Films set in the 1960s
Films shot in Kentucky
Films shot in Ohio
Films produced by Christine Vachon
Killer Films films
2010s English-language films
2010s American films